Worldticketshop is a ticket resale company founded in 2006 with over 40 staff. Worldticketshop is bootstrapped and privately owned. The company was founded by Sebastian Monteban, in 2006.

It is also a founding member of the EU Secondary Ticketing Association, and backer of EU Ticket News Europe's first business-to-business publication covering both the primary and secondary ticketing industries.

Awards and recognition
Worldticketshop was honored in the Netherlands for its fast rate of growth for mid-sized companies in the Netherlands at the Financial Dagblad Gazellen Awards in November 2009. They placed ninth overall in the country. The FD Gazellen Awards are awarded to companies that demonstrate a turnover growth of at least 20 percent over three consecutive years, Worldticketshop grew 527%.

In September 2009 and August 2010, Worldticketshop was listed in Twinkle Magazines' 100 largest Dutch e-commerce companies

In 2010, CEO Sebastian Monteban was named in the top 25 internet marketers in The Netherlands in 2010 in Emerce Magazine.

References

External links
 Worldticketshop Global home page

Online retailers of the Netherlands
Ticket sales companies
Dutch companies established in 2006
Retail companies established in 2006
Internet properties established in 2006
Companies based in Groningen (province)